Serampore Girl's College, established in 1981, is a women's college in Serampore, in Hooghly district. It offers undergraduate courses in science and arts. It is affiliated to the University of Calcutta. It is also the study center for postgraduate courses under Rabindra Bharati University.

Departments

Science 
 Computer Science
 Physics
 Electronics
 Mathematics
 Geography
 Economics
 Botany
 Chemistry
 Zoology

Arts 
 Bengali
 English
 Sanskrit
 History
 Geography
 Political science
 Philosophy
 Education
 Urdu
 Hindi
 Sociology

Accreditation 
The college is recognized by University Grant Commission. In 2007 it was accredited by the National Assessment and Accreditation Council (NAAC) and awarded B+ (older grading system).

In 2016, it was re-accredited by the National Assessment and Accreditation Council (NAAC), and awarded B (newer grading system).

Study Center of Rabindrabharati University 
The college has a study center for Rabindrabharati University for postgraduate courses in History, Bengali and English.

See also 
List of colleges affiliated to the University of Calcutta
Education in India
Education in West Bengal

References

External links 
 

University of Calcutta affiliates
Women's universities and colleges in West Bengal
Universities and colleges in Hooghly district
Serampore
Educational institutions established in 1981
1981 establishments in West Bengal